Erica Marie Skroski (born February 14, 1994) is an American retired soccer player who played as a defender.

Early life
A native of Galloway Township, New Jersey, Skroski played soccer at Absegami High School. In 2011, she was named to the All-South Jersey Girls' Soccer First Team, and was named The Press of Atlantic City Girls Soccer Player of the Year.

She played club youth soccer for NJSA under coach Kris Anderson.

College
From 2012 to 2015, Skroski played college soccer at Rutgers University, where she majored in exercise science and sport studies. She was selected to the 2012–13 Big East All-Academic Team, and was selected to the Academic All-Big Ten team in 2014 and 2015. For the 2014 season, she was selected to the All-Big Ten Second Team, and the 2014 Big Ten All-Tournament Team. In 2015, Skroski was named Big Ten Defender of the Year and was a First Team All-Big Ten selection. She was also a NSCAA Second Team All-American.

In the 2015 NCAA Division I women's soccer tournament, Rutgers reached the college cup for the first time in school history. Rutgers had built around defense, and Skroski and Brianne Reed anchored the back line for the team. In the quarterfinal, Rutgers held the No. 1 seed Virginia, the highest scoring team in the country, to a 0–0 draw, then advanced by defeating Virginia 7–6 in a penalty shoot-out. For the season, Rutgers set school records with 19 wins and 19 shutouts; their season ended with a loss to Penn State in the semi-final.

Professional career
Skroski was drafted by Sky Blue FC in the 3rd round of the 2016 NWSL College Draft. As a rookie, she played in all 20 games, playing all but six minutes during the 2016 NWSL season. She scored her first professional goal against the Boston Breakers on July 17, 2016. In October 2016, Sky Blue FC exercised Skroski's 2017 option.

Skroski played in 21 games with 20 starts during the 2017 NWSL season. She scored her first goal of the season on September 30 against Boston. After the 2017 season, Sky Blue FC extended a new contract offer to Skroski.

She made the Sky Blue FC opening-day roster for the 2018 NWSL season.

She was out of contract in December 2021.

International career
She was called up to the United States national under-23 team in January 2016 for a friendly against the Republic of Ireland. She was then called up to the United States under-23 team for the 2016 Istria Cup in March.

In January 2017, Skroski was called into a U.S. under-23 team training camp; she was one of four NWSL players named to the roster. She was named to the U.S. U-23 team rosters for the 2017 La Manga Tournament in March and the 2017 Nordic Tournament in June.

Career statistics

College

Club

References

External links
Rutgers bio
 

1994 births
Living people
Absegami High School alumni
American women's soccer players
People from Galloway Township, New Jersey
Rutgers Scarlet Knights women's soccer players
NJ/NY Gotham FC players
Soccer players from New Jersey
Sportspeople from Atlantic County, New Jersey
National Women's Soccer League players
NJ/NY Gotham FC draft picks
Women's association football defenders